Kole Joseph Heckendorf (born November 20, 1985) is an American football coach  and former wide receiver. After playing college football at North Dakota State, he was signed by the Green Bay Packers as an undrafted free agent in 2009. Heckendorf has also been a member of the Detroit Lions, Seattle Seahawks, San Diego Chargers, and Indianapolis Colts. Heckendorf is currently the offensive coordinator for St John's.

Early years
Heckendorf was born in Wausau, Wisconsin where he grew up. He played high school football for Mosinee High School in Mosinee, Wisconsin, as a wide receiver and a safety.

As a junior, Heckendorf was named first-team All-State by the Wisconsin Football Coaches Association (WFCA) and second-team All-State by the Associated Press and the Milwaukee Journal Sentinel after he set state records with 116 receptions for 1,714 yards and 11 touchdowns. He led the nation as a junior with 116 catches.

As a senior, he earned first-team All-State honors from both the Associated Press and the WFCA after making 63 catches for 1,257 yards and recording a state-record 19 touchdowns. He was also named All-Conference and All-District and was a second-team All-State selection by the Milwaukee Journal Sentinel.

His high school career totals of 3,831 yards and 36 touchdowns are state records and his 235 catches rank second all-time.

Heckendorf lettered in hockey all four years of high school, receiving honorable mention all-state honors once and all-conference honors three times. He was a member of an all-star traveling hockey team, Team Wisconsin.

College career
Heckendorf received a scholarship to play college football at North Dakota State University, as a wide receiver, where he finished as the all-time leading receiver in school history and became the first receiver in the history of the program to lead the team in receptions for four seasons.

Heckendorf redshirted in 2004. He had a career-high 52 receptions as a sophomore in 2006. He was named to the All-Northwest Region third-team by the Football Gazette and was voted to the All-GWFC second-team by the league's media after helping NDSU win the conference championship. As a junior, he earned All-Great West Football Conference first-team honors after ranking third in the league in both receptions and yards for the season. He was named a second-team All-Missouri Valley Football Conference selection in 2008. He finished the season ranked third in the conference in yards and fifth in receptions. He had a career day in the 2008 opener against Austin Peay, catching eight passes and notching new career highs of 179 receiving yards and three touchdowns. He made a career-high nine catches at Youngstown State later in the season. He was a member of the ESPN The Magazine Academic All-America first-team as a senior.

Heckendorf earned a B.S. in general education.

Professional career

Green Bay Packers
Heckendorf was signed by the Green Bay Packers as an undrafted free agent on May 1, 2009, but was released during the pre-season.

Detroit Lions
On October 12, 2009 Heckendorf was signed to the Detroit Lions' practice squad. After his contract expired following the season, he was re-signed to a future contract on January 5, 2010. He was cut by the Lions on May 11, 2010 and signed to the Seattle Seahawks May 12, 2010.

Seattle Seahawks
Heckendorf was claimed off waivers by the Seattle Seahawks on May 12, 2010 and released in the preseason on August 30.

San Diego Chargers
Heckendorf was signed to the San Diego Chargers practice squad on October 13, 2010.

References

External links
 Saint John's (MN) profile
 Green Bay Packers profile
 North Dakota State profile

1985 births
Living people
American football wide receivers
Detroit Lions players
Green Bay Packers players
Indianapolis Colts players
North Dakota State Bison football players
Saint John's Johnnies football coaches
San Diego Chargers players
Seattle Seahawks players
Sportspeople from Wausau, Wisconsin
Players of American football from Wisconsin